Hassan Akesbi (born 5 December 1934) is a Moroccan former footballer who played as a striker.

Career
In 2006, Akesbi was selected by the Confederation of African Football (CAF) as one of the best 200 African football players of the last 50 years.

Honours
Nîmes
 Coupe Charles Drago: 1956
 Coupe de France runner-up: 1958, 1961

Reims
 Division 1: 1961–62
 Mohammed V Cup: 1962

FUS de Rabat
 Moroccan Throne Cup: 1966–67

Individual
 11th Ligue 1 top goal scorer: 173 goals in 293 matches (119 goals in 204 matches for Nîmes Olympique; 48  goals in 78 matches for Stade de Reims; six goals in 11 matches for AS Monaco)

References

External links
 

1934 births
Living people
People from Tangier
Moroccan footballers
Association football forwards
Morocco international footballers
Ligue 1 players
Nîmes Olympique players
Stade de Reims players
AS Monaco FC players
Moroccan football managers
Fath Union Sport managers
Hassania Agadir managers
Fath Union Sport players
Ittihad Khemisset managers
Moroccan expatriate footballers
Moroccan expatriate sportspeople in France
Expatriate footballers in France
Moroccan expatriate sportspeople in Monaco
Expatriate footballers in Monaco